is a Japanese volleyball player who currently plays for Saitama Ageo Medics in the V.League 1. She is part of the Japan women's national volleyball team.

Clubs
  Nobeoka Gakuen High School (2007–2010)
  National Institute of Fitness and Sports (2010–2014)
  Hitachi Rivale (2013–2017)
  Pallavolo Hermaea (2017–2018)
  Toyota Auto Body Queenseis (2018–2020)
  Saitama Ageo Medics (2020–present)

Awards

Individual
 2014 Kurowashiki Tournament  - Best Newcomer
 :2017 FIVB Volleyball Women's World Grand Champions Cup  - Best Receiver

Club
2015/16 V.Premier League -  Runner-up, with Hitachi Rivale
2016/17 V.Premier League -  Bronze medal, with Hitachi Rivale
2018/19 Empress Cup -  Runner-up, with Toyota Auto Body Queenseis
2020/21 V-Cup -  Champion, with Saitama Ageo Medics

National team
 2014 Montreux Volley Masters - 6th place
 2014 FIVB World Grand Prix -  Silver medal
 2015 FIVB World Cup – 5th place
 2015 FIVB World Grand Prix - 6th place
 2016 FIVB World Grand Prix - 9th place
 2017 FIVB World Grand Prix - 7th place
 2017 FIVB World Grand Champions Cup - 5th place
 2017 Asian Championship -  Champion
 2018 FIVB Nations League - 10th place
 2018 FIVB World Championship - 6th place
 2019 FIVB Nations League - 9th place

External links

 Mami Uchiseto | Twitter
 Mami Uchiseto | Instagram

References

1991 births
Living people
Japanese women's volleyball players
Ageo Medics players
Sportspeople from Miyazaki Prefecture